Taohelong is a genus of nodosaurid dinosaur known from Lower Cretaceous rocks in north-central China.

Taohelong is based on Gansu Dinosaur Museum (GSDM) 00021, fossils including a tail vertebra, ribs, a left ilium (the main bone of the hip), and bony armor recovered from the Hekou Group in the Lanzhou-Minhe Basin. The animal's armor includes part of a "sacral shield", a carpet of osteoderms over the hips found in some other ankylosaurians. Taohelong was named and described in 2013 by Yang Jing-Tao, You Hai-Lu, Li Da-Qing, and Kong De-Lai.  The type species is Taohelong jinchengensis. The generic name means "dragon (long) of the river (he) Tao". The specific name refers to the provenance at Jincheng.

The describers established some diagnostic traits. The neural channel of the tail vertebra has a cross-section like an inverted trapezium. In top view the profile of the outer rim of the ilium is like a mirrored "S". The osteoderms of the sacral shield are irregular in both shape and size.

Taohelong was placed in the Nodosauridae, more precisely in the Polacanthinae. Yang et al. performed a phylogenetic analysis and found Taohelong to be the sister taxon to Polacanthus foxii, making it the first polacanthine to be described from Asia.

See also

 Timeline of ankylosaur research

References

Nodosaurids
Early Cretaceous dinosaurs of Asia
Fossil taxa described in 2013
Paleontology in Gansu
Ornithischian genera